Zalmoxis is a divinity of the Getae and Dacians

Zalmoxis may also refer to:
Zalmoxis (harvestman), a genus of arachnids in the family Zalmoxidae

See also
Zamolxis  (bug), a genus of insects in the family Reduviidae